Eve Ferret (born 14 October 1955 in Pimlico, London, England) is a British actress, comedian, and singer-songwriter known for her work on the films Haunted Honeymoon (1986), Absolute Beginners (1986), and EastEnders (2019).

Personal life
Eve Ferret is the eldest of three children born in Pimlico, London. 
Mother, Janet is one of seven sisters also raised in Pimlico and was a professional Tea Lady. Her father, Paul Ferret from Barnet, painted the Pimlico houses in summer and at one point delivered the coal in winter. Eve and her family are related to the Gypsy Jazz guitarists Pierre 'Baro' Ferret, Jean 'Matelo' Ferret, and Etienne 'Sarane' Ferret who played with Django Reinhardt in the Quintette of the Hot Club Of France.

Career
Ferret graduated from singing in a cabaret act called Biddie & Eve at the seminal 'Blitz' nightclub in the late 1970s to appearing alongside David Bowie in both his Grammy Award-winning video Jazzin' for Blue Jean and director Julian Temple's Absolute Beginners as Big Jill to starring in Hollywood movies, chosen by Gene Wilder to appear alongside him as Sylvia, an ex-girlfriend, in his movie Haunted Honeymoon. Ronald Neame (who directed Judy Garland's last film) also chose Eve to play Norah Plumb in his film Foreign Body. Ferret has worked with some of the best in the film and TV industry.

Filmography

Theatre

References

External links
 
 

1955 births
Living people
British film actresses
20th-century British actresses
21st-century British actresses
People from Pimlico